The WVU Coliseum is a 14,000-seat multi-purpose arena located on the Evansdale campus of West Virginia University in Morgantown, West Virginia. The circular arena features a poured concrete roof. It was built with state funds and replaced the WVU Fieldhouse, which seated 6,000.

History
It is home to West Virginia University Mountaineers sports teams, including the men's and women's basketball teams, men's wrestling, and women's volleyball and gymnastics. There is also a  weight room located in the lower level of the Coliseum. The arena has nearly 100 offices, 13 lecture and seminar rooms, a dance studio, safety lab, racquetball and squash courts, and the Jerry West Mountaineer Room, which holds nearly 150 people for meetings. The arena also has more than 1,000 individual locker units in various dressing rooms available for students and staff.

The Coliseum has been used for music concerts but the concrete roof has poor sound distribution properties, so other venues in town are more appropriate for this purpose. The arena was actually designed with poor acoustics; the designers cupped the ceiling so that crowd noise generated at basketball games would be directed back to the floor. The seating at the venue was also designed for optimized viewing during sporting events, making the setup for concerts to be not as optimal as other large arenas.

The first event held at the Coliseum was a Grand Funk Railroad concert in 1970, with the first game then taking place on 1 December 1970. The Coliseum was one of the sites for games of the 1974 NCAA Men's Division I Basketball Tournament. Other National Collegiate Athletic Association (NCAA) men's Division I college basketball events it has hosted include the ECAC South Region tournament organized by the Eastern College Athletic Conference (ECAC) in 1975 and 1976 and the Atlantic 10 Conference men's basketball tournament in 1984 and 1988.

During the 1998-99 season, the Jerry West Lounge, named for WVU and NBA Hall-of-Famer Jerry West, was formally dedicated. A display showcasing the highlights of the Mountaineer great flanks the entrance to the lounge. In November 2005, the University announced that a life size bronze statue of West would adorn the Blue Gate entrance of the Coliseum, and the statue has since been installed there. Wests number is retired and a sign hangs over the seating section formerly designated Section 44 (now Section 236, after renovation) with "Jerry West 44" written on it. Hot Rod Hundleys number 33 also is retired and hangs from the walls. On February 29, 2020, the number 44 was retired again in honor of Rod Thorn, who had worn the number immediately after West; Thorn's sign hangs over Section 226.

In 1999-2000, the school was forced to play a year of games split between Wheeling and Charleston, and the gymnasium at nearby Fairmont State University while asbestos was removed from the Coliseum.

In 2004, the Coliseum underwent an upgrade which included renovations to the men's and women's locker rooms, construction of a player's lounge and team video theater, expansion of the equipment and athletic training rooms, refurbishment of the Coliseum roof, and construction of a club seating area in the main arena complete with a private space for concessions, hospitality area, and rest rooms under the lower level seats.

In 2008, the Coliseum received a new video scoreboard, a new public address system, a new lighting system, two LED ribbon boards, and a new floor design.  WVU Athletic Director Ed Pastilong also announced the construction of a new $20–$22 million practice facility to be built adjacent to the Coliseum.

In 2016, the concourse area of the Coliseum underwent major renovation to enhance the fan experience, widening the concourse for better traffic flow, adding new concession areas (including self-serve options), and more than doubling the building's restroom capacity.  During the summer of 2020, the arena's original 1970-era seats were replaced.  The re-seating project did not change the Coliseum's seating capacity.  The arena also received a new video scoreboard, with a larger display area and higher resolution than the previous scoreboard.

In 2019, the playing surface was replaced. The new playing surface is the sixth court in the Coliseum since opening in 1970. The previous playing surface was installed in 2009, but was repainted in 2012 when West Virginia University changed conferences from the Big East to the Big 12 in 2012. The new court returns to the theme of West Virginia's historic courts with a primarily blue color scheme, and the design coincides with WVU's school-wide Nike rebranding efforts.

Top crowds

Year by year results

West Virginia Men's Basketball season results in the Coliseum

OVERALL: 549–159

See also
 List of NCAA Division I basketball arenas

References

External links
WVUSports.com on the WVU Coliseum
WVU Coliseum Information

West Virginia University campus
College basketball venues in the United States
West Virginia Mountaineers basketball
Indoor arenas in West Virginia
Basketball venues in West Virginia
Sports venues in West Virginia